Eldridge Bay is an Arctic waterway Melville Island's Sabine Peninsula, the bay is an arm of Hecla and Griper Bay. Sabine Bay is to the south.

References

Bays of Qikiqtaaluk Region